Pestalozzi is the surname of an Italian family originally based in Gravedona and Chiavenna who settled in Switzerland during the Counter-Reformation. Members of this family include:

 Johann Heinrich Pestalozzi (1746–1827), Swiss pedagogue and educational reformer
 Max Pestalozzi (1857–1925), Swiss chess master
 Hans A. Pestalozzi (1929–2004), Swiss social critic

See also
 Colegio Pestalozzi (disambiguation)
 Pestalozzi-Gymnasium Biberach, Germany
 Pestalozzi-Stiftung Hamburg, Germany
 Kinderdorf Pestalozzi, Switzerland
 Pestalozzianum, Switzerland
 Pestalozzi International Village, United Kingdom

Surnames of Italian origin